Desmia deploralis, the deploring desmia moth, is a moth in the family Crambidae. It was described by George Hampson in 1912. It is found in Paraguay, Cuba, Jamaica and Florida.

References

Moths described in 1912
Desmia
Moths of North America
Moths of South America